Chinna Durai is a 1999 Indian Tamil-language drama film directed by R. Chandra. The film stars Sarathkumar and Roja whilst Sithara, Vijayakumar and Manivannan play supporting roles.

Cast
Sarathkumar as Chinnadurai
Roja as Pushpavalli
Sithara as Maragatham
Manivannan
R. Sundarrajan
Vijayakumar
Ponnambalam
Bayilvan Ranganathan
C. R. Saraswathi
Ragasudha
Periya Karuppu Thevar
Thyagu
LIC Narasimhan

Soundtrack

Reception
BBthots wrote "A predictable and mostly boring generic movie which looks and sounds exactly like every other movie ever made in a village setting." Deccan Herald wrote "The best things in Chinna Dorai are the child, who’s not more than six months old, Mani Vannan and the costumes, particularly those of Roja and Sharath Kumar".

References

External links

1999 films
1990s Tamil-language films
Films scored by Ilaiyaraaja